Oriental Theatre or Oriental Theater may refer to:

Oriental Theatre (Chicago)
Oriental Theater (Denver, Colorado), listed on the NRHP in Denver, Colorado
Oriental Theatre (Milwaukee)
Oriental Theatre (Portland, Oregon)